Yardena is a moshav in northern Israel. Located on route 90, 13 kilometers north of Beit She'an, it falls under the jurisdiction of Valley of Springs Regional Council.

History
Yardena was founded in 1952 by immigrants to Israel from Iraqi Kurdistan. It is named "Yardena" (Jordan in Hebrew) because it is on the Jordan River. A school in the moshav been converted into the Center for Kurdistan Cultural Heritage.

References

Moshavim
Populated places in Northern District (Israel)
Populated places established in 1952
1952 establishments in Israel
Kurdish-Jewish culture in Israel
Iraqi-Jewish culture in Israel